Melicope balloui, also called Ballou's melicope  or rock pelea, is a species of plant in the family Rutaceae. It is endemic to the Hawaiian Islands.  It is threatened by habitat loss. Like other Hawaiian Melicope, this species is known as alani.

This plant was described in 1913 by Joseph Rock, who named it after Howard M. Ballou, proofreader of his book on Hawaiian trees. It is a shrub or small tree with leathery oval leaves up to 10 centimeters long by 7 wide. Young twigs are coated in yellow-brown hairs. The female inflorescence contains 5 to 9 flowers; the male flower has never been seen. The fruit is a capsule about 2.5 centimeters wide.

This plant is only known from the slopes of the volcano Haleakalā on Maui. There is a single occurrence containing an unknown number of plants.

References

balloui
Endemic flora of Hawaii
Biota of Maui
Taxonomy articles created by Polbot
Critically endangered flora of the United States